Real is the name of the first mixtape of Colombian reggaeton singer J Balvin, published in 2007. It has the collaboration of Jowell, Final & Shako, Jutha, Sara Tunes, Andy Aguilera, Karma, El Tigre, Under Pressure, Bufalo and K-Litos.

It featured the songs «Éxtasis», «Sencillo» and «Una obra de arte» with Final & Shako, which were published in 2007.

List of songs 
 Standard edition (2007)

Special Edition 
Real: Special Edition is the name of the re-release of the first mixtape by Colombian reggaeton singer J Balvin, released on May 7, 2009, by EMI Music. She counted on the collaborations of artists such as Golpe A Golpe, Héctor El Father, J Álvarez, Reykon and with songs like «Ella me cautivo», «No me vuelvo a enamorar» and «Hola que tal».

Background and release 
This special edition, published on May 7, 2009, won gold in Colombia for the high sales, thus making J Balvin the first Colombian artist of the urban genre to obtain this recognition. Thanks to themes such as «Hola que tal» and «Ella me cautivó» (which appeared in the special edition) Balvin was the revelation artist of the 2009 radio station La Mega. In addition, young revelation composer of Antioquia 2009, according to the Departmental Assembly of Antioquia; artist of the year Tropicana, in Barranquilla; best summer artist 40 of Los 40 Principales and best artist of the year Oxígeno Bogotá. «Ella me cautivó» in the United States, entered the Tropical Songs list of Billboard in position 35, thus became his first entry in an international list.
 Special edition (2009)

Special edition with a DVD (2009)

Certifications

References 

2007 albums
J Balvin albums